Rolfe Arnold Scott-James OBE, (1878–1959) was a British journalist, editor and literary critic. He is often cited as one of the first people to use the word "modernism" in his 1908 book Modernism and Romance, in which he writes, "there are characteristics of modern life in general which can only be summed up, as Mr. Thomas Hardy and others have summed them up, by the word, modernism" (p. ix).

Biography
Scott-James was educated at Brasenose College, Oxford, and graduated in 1901. The Dictionary of National Biography states that Scott-James "possessed a strongly developed social conscience: this manifested itself at many different points in his career in activities which, if distinct from his literary gifts, at the same time enriched them" (872). In 1914, Scott-James, then a close friend of Wyndham Lewis, became the editor of the New Weekly, which did not survive the outbreak of war later that year. During the war, Scott-James enlisted in the Royal Garrison Artillery and fought in France, and by the end of the war he had risen to the rank of Captain and in 1918 was awarded the Military Cross.

In 1934, Scott-James took over the editorship of the influential magazine, the London Mercury from J. C. Squire, in which he published many canonically recognized authors of modernism. The last issue of the London Mercury in April 1939 contained W. H. Auden's "In Memory of W. B. Yeats."

In 1955 he was made an Officer of the Order of the British Empire.

His daughter Anne Scott-James also became a prominent journalist. The military historian Max Hastings is his grandson.

Editorships and literary positions
 Literary editor, Daily News, London (1902–1912)
 New Weekly, London (1914)
 Lead-Writer, the Daily Chronicle, London (1919–1930)
 Assistant editor, the Spectator, London (1933-1935; 1939-1945)
 London Mercury, London (1934–1939)
 Britain To-day (1940–1954)

Bibliography
1908: Modernism and Romance. New York and London: John Lane
1910: An Englishman in Ireland: Impressions of a Journey in a Canoe by River, Lough and Canal 
1913: The Influence of the Press 
1913: Personality in Literature 
1928:  The Making of Literature: Some Principles of Criticism Examined in the Light of Ancient and Modern Theory. New York: Holt and Company
1951: Thomas Hardy Short Study
1951: Fifty Years of English Literature, 1900-1950 
1955: Lytton Strachey Short Study

References 

 Scott-James, R. A. Modernism and Romance. New York and London: John Lane, 1908. 
 Dictionary of National Biography, 1951-1960. Edited by E. T. Williams and Helen M. Palmer. London: Oxford UP, 1971.

External links
 
 

1878 births
1959 deaths
British male journalists
English literary critics
Place of birth missing
Officers of the Order of the British Empire